El Tigre is a village in Buenaventura Municipality, Valle del Cauca Department in Colombia.

Climate
El Tigre has a very wet tropical rainforest climate (Af) with heavy to extremely heavy rainfall year-round. Only the rainfall data is available for this village.

References

Populated places in the Valle del Cauca Department